25 North Colonnade is a commercial building in Canary Wharf, London formerly occupied by the Financial Conduct Authority, after having been solely occupied by its predecessor, the Financial Services Authority (FSA) until early 2013. Built in 1991, its developer was the Canary Wharf Group, and its architect was Troughton McAslan.

See also
Canary Wharf
Tall buildings in London

External links

Google Maps location
John McAslan + Partners architects
Emporis.com

Skyscrapers in the London Borough of Tower Hamlets
Buildings and structures in the London Borough of Tower Hamlets
Canary Wharf buildings
Skyscraper office buildings in London

Office buildings completed in 1991